Christelle Morançais (born 28 January 1975) is a French politician of the Republicans (LR) who has been serving as the Regional Council President for the Pays de la Loire region since 2017.

Early career
A graduate of a business school, Morançais worked for twenty years in real estate. Together with her husband, she eventually founded the real estate company MegAgence in 2009.

Political career
In 2018, Morançais was appointed to the shadow cabinet of LR leader Laurent Wauquiez. Since 2019, she has been serving as deputy chair of LR. 

In December 2021, Morançais became one of the six spokespersons for the LR candidate for the 2022 presidential election, Valérie Pécresse.

References

1975 births
Living people
Presidents of the Regional Council of Pays de la Loire
The Republicans (France) politicians
Politicians from Pays de la Loire
People from Le Mans
Presidents of French regions and overseas collectivities
21st-century French women politicians